The 2006 Campeonato Brasileiro Série A was the 50th edition of the Campeonato Brasileiro Série A. It began on April 15, 2006, and reached its end on December 3, 2006.

Format
The format was similar to the 2005 edition, though fielding two fewer teams.  20 teams competed, each team playing the other in a home-and-away format.  At the season finale, the team with the most accumulated points (3 for each win, 1 for a draw, none for a loss) was declared champion.

Calendar
From April 15 through June 4, 10 rounds were played.  From June 9 until July 9, the tournament was suspended for the FIFA World Cup 2006.  Play resumed on July 12 and continued until December 3.

Several teams had their attentions divided between other tournaments over the same duration:
 Copa do Brasil - Flamengo defeated Vasco da Gama
 Copa Libertadores - Internacional defeated São Paulo
 Copa Sudamericana - Atlético-PR was the best Brazilian team, losing in the semifinals.

Final standings

Top goal scorers

Fixtures and results

External links
 Campeonato Brasileiro Série A 2006 at RSSSF

Campeonato Brasileiro Série A seasons
1